Dalić is a Croatian surname. Notable people with the surname include:

Martina Dalić (born 1967), Croatian economist
Zlatko Dalić (born 1966), Croatian footballer and manager

Croatian surnames
Slavic-language surnames
Patronymic surnames